is a Japanese professional basketball player who plays for Nagoya Diamond Dolphins of the B.League in Japan. He represented the country in basketball.

He is a native of the Mie Prefecture.

References

External links
 Shuto Ando

1994 births
Living people
Japanese men's basketball players
Nagoya Diamond Dolphins players
Sportspeople from Mie Prefecture
2019 FIBA Basketball World Cup players
Shooting guards